Yolanda of Poland or Yolanda of Hungary, also Blessed Yolanda (also known as Helen; 1235 – 11 June 1298) was the daughter of King Béla IV of Hungary and Maria Laskarina. She was the sister of Margaret of Hungary and Kinga of Poland (Cunegunda). One of her paternal aunts was the Franciscan Elizabeth of Hungary.

Life 
As a young girl, Yolanda was sent to Poland to be tutored under the supervision of her sister, Kinga, who was married to the Duke of Poland. There, she was encouraged to marry Bolesław the Pious, which she did in 1257. 
They had three daughters:
 Elisabeth of Kalisz (1263 – 28 September 1304); married Henry V, Duke of Legnica
 Jadwiga of Kalisz (1266 – 10 December 1339); married Władysław I the Elbow-high, King of Poland;;
 Anna of Kalisz (born 1278, date of death unknown); a nun in Gniezno.

During the time of her marriage, she was noted for her great services to the poor and needy of the country, as well as being a major benefactor of the monasteries, friaries and hospitals connected to them. Her husband gave her so much support in her charities that he earned the nickname "the Pious". She was widowed in 1279.

Religious work
Following Boleslaus' death, Yolanda and Kinga, along with one of Yolanda's daughters, Anna, retired to the Poor Clare monastery that Kinga had founded in Sandez. Forced to relocate due to armed conflict in the region, Yolanda founded a new monastery in Gniezno. She was persuaded to become abbess of the community of nuns shortly before her death.

Veneration
She has been declared a candidate for sainthood. Her sisters, Kinga and Margaret, have already been canonized.

References

Sources

External links
Helen of Poland

1235 births
1298 deaths
13th-century Hungarian people
13th-century Polish nuns
13th-century venerated Christians
13th-century Hungarian women
Polish philanthropists
Beatified and canonised Árpádians
Hungarian princesses
Roman Catholic royal saints
Polish beatified people
Polish Roman Catholic saints
Hungarian people of Greek descent
Franciscan beatified people
Poor Clare abbesses
House of Árpád
Duchesses of Greater Poland
Daughters of kings